James Lee Crawford (August 26, 1935 – June 10, 2018) was a professional American football player who played running back for five seasons for the Boston Patriots. He ran for 1078 yards and caught for 501 in 5 years. He was nicknamed "cowboy".

See also
 List of college football yearly rushing leaders

References

1935 births
2018 deaths
People from Greybull, Wyoming
American football running backs
Wyoming Cowboys football players
Boston Patriots players
American Football League players
Players of American football from Wyoming